The Long Secret is a children's novel written and illustrated by Louise Fitzhugh that was released by Harper & Row on October 27, 1965. It is a sequel or "companion" to Harriet the Spy (1964), the only one published during Fitzhugh's lifetime.

Sport, another sequel to Harriet written by Fitzhugh, was published by the Dell imprint Delacorte Press in 1979.

Plot summary
Harriet and her family are spending their summer in the beach town of Water Mill (which is on Long Island). Her summertime friend, twelve-year-old Beth Ellen Hanson, sometimes called Mouse, is also in Water Mill with her grandmother. Mysterious anonymous notes start showing up all over town; they have a religious slant and expose the faults of the recipients. Harriet is determined to find out who is leaving them. She suspects anyone who reads the Bible.

Harriet drags Beth Ellen along on spying expeditions directed against Bunny, the piano-playing manager of the local hotel, and the Jenkinses, an eccentric southern family preoccupied with money-making schemes. Harriet's other best friend Janie Gibbs and Mrs Agatha K. Plumber from Harriet the Spy also appear.

Beth Ellen learns that her rich mother, who left when she was five, is returning from Europe with her new husband Wallace. Her grandmother expects Beth Ellen to be excited by the news but she is indifferent. Her mother Zeeney turns out to be a beautiful but shallow socialite who is dissatisfied with her shy and serious daughter. Beth Ellen's dislike of her mother finally explodes in a temper tantrum which clears her head, leaving her happier and more confident.

References

1965 American novels
1965 children's books
American children's novels
Children's mystery novels
Harper & Row books
Novels set in Long Island
Southampton (town), New York